Jonathan Keith Smart (born September 21, 1964) is an American collegiate basketball coach and former player.

Playing career
He is perhaps best remembered for hitting the game-winning shot in the 1987 NCAA championship game that gave the Indiana Hoosiers a 74–73 victory over the Syracuse Orangemen. He had transferred to Indiana from Garden City Community College in Kansas where he was a two-year standout and Jayhawk Conference Player of the Year.

After two seasons at Indiana, Smart was signed by the San Antonio Spurs, with whom he played two games in the 1988–89 season. In 12 minutes, Smart scored two points and had two assists and one rebound.  Smart later played in the Philippines, with the San Miguel Beermen of the PBA, in the 1989 Reinforced Conference, where he played through an injury and was eventually replaced by Ennis Whatley after only five games. After the PBA, he played in the World Basketball League: first with the Worcester Counts in 1989. He then played for the Youngstown Pride and was traded to the Halifax Windjammers in March 1991. Smart later played in the Continental Basketball Association with the Rapid City Thrillers (1995–96) and Fort Wayne Fury (1996–97).  He also played two seasons in France, and one in Venezuela.

Coaching career
In 2002, Smart finished the season as interim coach of the Cleveland Cavaliers. His record was 9–31 with the club. In 2003, he became an assistant with the Golden State Warriors.

In 2010, Smart took over for Golden State Warriors head coach Don Nelson before the start of the 2010-11 training camp.

The Warriors fired Smart on April 27, 2011 following a 36 win season, a 10-game improvement from the previous season. He joined the Sacramento Kings as an assistant coach in November 2011. On January 5, 2012, the Kings named Smart head coach after firing Paul Westphal. He recorded a 48–93 record over parts of two seasons with the team. On May 31, 2013, the Kings fired Smart with one year remaining on his contract.
On September 17, 2014, the Miami Heat announced they had hired Smart as an assistant coach.

On December 6, 2019, Smart was fired by the New York Knicks.

On May 12, 2021, Smart was announced as Assistant Coach of the Arkansas Razorbacks under Head Coach Eric Musselman.
On January 15, 2022, Smart served one game as the Arkansas interim coach while Musselman was out with shoulder surgery. Smart led the unranked Razorbacks to a thrilling 65-58 victory over No. 12 LSU in Baton Rouge.

Personal life
Smart and his wife Carol have two children. His son Jared is currently a wide receiver for the University of Hawaii.

Head coaching record

|-
| align="left" |Cleveland
| align="left" |
|40||9||31||.225|| align="center" |8th in Central||—||—||—||—
| align="center" |Missed Playoffs
|-
| align="left" |Golden State
| align="left" |
|82||36||46||.439|| align="center" |3rd in Pacific||—||—||—||—
| align="center" |Missed Playoffs
|-
| align="left" |Sacramento
| align="left" |
|59||20||39||.339|| align="center" |5th in Pacific||—||—||—||—
| align="center" |Missed Playoffs
|-
| align="left" |Sacramento
| align="left" |
|82||28||54||||4th in Pacific |||—||—||—||—
| align="center" |Missed Playoffs
|-class="sortbottom"
| align="center" colspan="2"|Career
|263||93||170||||—||—||—||—||

See also

Notes

External links
 
 BasketballReference.com: Keith Smart (as coach)

1964 births
Living people
20th-century African-American sportspeople
21st-century African-American people
African-American basketball coaches
African-American basketball players
American expatriate basketball people in Canada
American expatriate basketball people in France
American expatriate basketball people in the Philippines
American expatriate basketball people in Venezuela
American men's basketball players
Basketball coaches from Louisiana
Basketball players at the 1987 Pan American Games
Basketball players from Baton Rouge, Louisiana
Cedar Rapids Silver Bullets players
Cleveland Cavaliers assistant coaches
Cleveland Cavaliers head coaches
Continental Basketball Association coaches
Florida Beachdogs players
Fort Wayne Fury players
Garden City Broncbusters men's basketball players
Golden State Warriors assistant coaches
Golden State Warriors draft picks
Golden State Warriors head coaches
Guaros de Lara (basketball) players
Indiana Hoosiers men's basketball players
McKinley Senior High School alumni
Medalists at the 1987 Pan American Games
Memphis Grizzlies assistant coaches
Miami Heat assistant coaches
New York Knicks assistant coaches
Pan American Games medalists in basketball
Pan American Games silver medalists for the United States
Philippine Basketball Association imports
Point guards
Sacramento Kings assistant coaches
Sacramento Kings head coaches
San Antonio Spurs players
San Miguel Beermen players
Trotamundos B.B.C. players